Pithiviers is a commune in the Loiret department, north central France. It is one of the subprefectures of Loiret. It is twinned with Ashby-de-la-Zouch in Leicestershire, England and Burglengenfeld in Bavaria, Germany.

Its attractions include a cinema, a theatre and a preserved steam railway.

During World War II, Pithiviers was the location of the infamous Pithiviers internment camp.

The pithivier, a kind of pie, is said to originate here in the middle ages. The traditional Pithivier was a small scalloped-edge sweet tartlet. Savoury versions can be filled with peacock, heron, swan or pork.

Population

Personalities  
Helvise of Pithiviers (965/970-1025), related to the Counts of Blois family, she built the castle of Pithivers. 
Michel Odent - French obstetrician, surgeon & childbirth specialist. World renowned for his work at Pithiviers Hospital & Midwifery (1962-1985) as well as his many publications supporting natural birth. Birth Reborn-1984
Steve Marlet - footballer with CM Aubervilliers. He was born here in 1974.
Xavier Dectot - curator and art historian who was born here in 1973.
Marie Ndiaye - novelist and playwright who was born here in 1967.
Siméon Poisson -  mathematician born here in 1781 and died in 1840.
Louis Lebègue Duportail - French military leader during the American Revolutionary War, born here in 1743.
 Armenian monk Gregory of Nicopolis (also called Gregory Makar and Grégoire de Nicopolis) brought gingerbread to Europe from Pithiviers in the 10th century.

See also
 Communes of the Loiret department
 Tramway de Pithiviers à Toury

References

Communes of Loiret
Subprefectures in France
Orléanais